James Aitchison (26 May 1920 – 13 February 1994) was a Scottish minister in the Church of Scotland and a first-class cricketer.

Career
Only two other players have appeared more times in first class cricket for Scotland, and Aitchison holds the team's record for most career runs and highest individual score. In the match against Ireland in 1959 he batted throughout the first day to make 190 not out. In club cricket for Kilmarnock he made 18,344 runs with 56 centuries.

Aitchison served as a minister in the Church of Scotland for 34 years until his retirement in 1986. During his career he took on a divinity student to help her learn whilst he was minister of Broomhill in Glasgow. The Reverend Euphemia Irvine was to be the first woman to lead a parish in Scotland. In 2011 he was one of the twelve initial inductees into the Scottish Cricket Hall of Fame.

References

External links

1920 births
1994 deaths
Scottish cricketers
20th-century Ministers of the Church of Scotland
Sportspeople from Kilmarnock